The Capt. Timothy Johnson House is a historic late First Period house in North Andover, Massachusetts.  The -story wood-frame gambrel-roofed house was built ca. 1720 by Timothy Johnson, a leading Andover resident who led Massachusetts troops in the 1745 Siege of Louisbourg. The building has a wealth of well-preserved first and second period Georgian detailing.

The house was listed on the National Register of Historic Places in 1990., and is currently occupied.

See also
National Register of Historic Places listings in Essex County, Massachusetts
List of the oldest buildings in Massachusetts

References

Houses in North Andover, Massachusetts
Houses on the National Register of Historic Places in Essex County, Massachusetts